Warren Van Dyke "Pete" Musser (December 15, 1926 – November 25, 2019) was the chairman of the Musser Group. He was the founder of Safeguard Scientifics, a venture capital firm that invested in technology companies. At the peak of the dot-com bubble, Musser was a billionaire on paper; however, when the bubble burst, he lost almost his entire fortune.

Musser was a philanthropist and The Musser Foundation has donated over $50 million to organizations including the Boy Scouts of America. Musser has served on the board of directors of the Cradle of Liberty Council. The Musser Award for Excellence in Leadership from Fox School of Business and Management at Temple University and the Musser Scout Reservation in Montgomery County, Pennsylvania, are named after Musser.

Early life and education
Musser was born in the Harrisburg, Pennsylvania, area on December 15, 1926 and earned a Bachelor of Science in Industrial Engineering at Lehigh University in 1949.

Career
In 1952, at the age of 25, Musser went to work as a stockbroker trainee for Hornblower & Weeks. The next year, he left the company with others to form their own company. In 1955, his company acquired Safe-Guard Corporation and in 1966, Musser's firm changed its name to Safeguard Industries. Musser invested in technology companies in  Philicon Valley such as QVC, Comcast, and Novell, which resulted in a $200 million profit.

In March 1996, when Ken Fox and Walter Buckley left Safeguard Scientifics to form Internet Capital Group (later Actua Corporation), they asked Musser for $5 million in funding, but he insisted on investing $15 million. At the height of the dot-com bubble, the company had a market capitalization of almost $60 billion, making Musser a paper billionaire.  Musser was a director of TyCom, a subsidiary of Tyco International, and in December 2000, he borrowed $14.1 million from Tyco executives Dennis Kozlowski and Mark H. Swartz

On November 29, 2000, after the burst of the dot-com bubble, to repay a loan, Musser was forced to sell 6.5 million of his shares in Safeguard Scientifics for $8.25 per share, or $53.7 million. The stock price was down over 90% from the peak of $99 per share 9 months earlier. This left him with 560,000 shares in the company. In 2003, Musser defaulted on a $26.5 million loan from Safeguard Scientifics.

Musser was a member of the board of directors of Brandywine Realty Trust from 1996, when the company acquired properties from a joint venture of Safeguard Scientifics, until 2002.

Personal life
Musser married and divorced Betty K. Musser (née Umstad) and then Hilary Grinker Musser, who was 39 years younger than him.

Musser's son, Craig, a renowned kaleidoscope artist under the name Van Dyke, was partnered with Bruce Darda, a New York based tech executive, at the time of his death from AIDS in 1986.

Musser spent lavishly on his residences, building his-and-hers tennis courts on his Nantucket residence and spending $100,000 on special garage doors.

Musser also was a contributor to Republican causes. He died on November 25, 2019.

References

1926 births
2019 deaths
20th-century American businesspeople
American chief executives
American financial businesspeople
Businesspeople from Philadelphia
Knights Commander of the Order of the British Empire
Lehigh University alumni
Pennsylvania Republicans
People from Harrisburg, Pennsylvania
20th-century American philanthropists